Aleksandr Maseikov (Sometimes listed as Aleksandr Maseykov, born July 26, 1971), is a Soviet-born Belarusian sprint canoeist who competed from the early 1990s to the early 2000s (decade). He was born in Mogilev and was affiliated with Dynamo Mogilev. Competing in three Summer Olympics, he won a gold in the C-2 500 m event at Barcelona in 1992 representing the Unified Team.

Maseikov also won three medals at the ICF Canoe Sprint World Championships with two golds (C-2 200 m: 1994, C-4 200 m: 1997) and one silver (C-4 200 m: 1998).

References

Biography of ALeksandr Maseikov 

1971 births
Living people
People from Mogilev
Belarusian male canoeists
Canoeists at the 1992 Summer Olympics
Canoeists at the 1996 Summer Olympics
Canoeists at the 2000 Summer Olympics
Olympic canoeists of Belarus
Olympic canoeists of the Unified Team
Soviet male canoeists
Olympic medalists in canoeing
ICF Canoe Sprint World Championships medalists in Canadian
Medalists at the 1992 Summer Olympics
Olympic gold medalists for the Unified Team
Dynamo sports society athletes
Sportspeople from Mogilev Region